Larin may refer to:
Larin (name)
Larin (currency) used around the Arabian Sea
Larin izbor, a Croatian telenovela
 A brand name of ethinylestradiol/norethisterone acetate, a combined oral contraceptive